Raghuleela Mall may refer to: 
 Raghuleela Mall located at Vashi.
 Raghuleela Mall located at Kandivili.